Information is the debut studio album by Berlin. It was released in 1980 by Vinyl Records, and was recorded during the period when Terri Nunn had temporarily left the band to pursue an acting career and Virginia Macolino performed the lead vocals. Several songs were written by previous lead singer Toni Childs who went solo prior to the album's release.

Track listing

Personnel
 Virginia Macolino – lead vocals
 Chris Velasco – guitars
 Jo Julian – synthesizer, backing vocals, producer, engineer
 Dan Wyman – synthesizer
 John Crawford – bass
 Dan Van Patten – drums
 Jim Cypherd – assistant engineer, synthesizer
 Paul Lewis – assistant engineer

References

Berlin (band) albums
1980 debut albums